The mud pebblesnail, scientific name Somatogyrus sargenti, is a species of small freshwater snails with a gill and an operculum,  aquatic gastropod mollusks in the family Hydrobiidae. This species is endemic to the United States.

References

Endemic fauna of the United States
Somatogyrus
Gastropods described in 1895
Taxonomy articles created by Polbot